The Wichita Braves were an American Triple-A minor league baseball franchise based in Wichita, Kansas, that played in the American Association from 1956 to 1958 as the top affiliate of the Milwaukee Braves of the National League.

The Braves were immediately preceded in Wichita by the Class A Wichita Indians (1950–1955) of the Western League, who were an affiliate of the Baltimore Orioles. In 1959, Wichita moved to Fort Worth, Texas, to become the Fort Worth Cats, remaining in the American Association.

History

In effect, the Wichita Braves were the successor of the Milwaukee Brewers, the Braves' predecessors in Milwaukee, Wisconsin. When the major-league Braves moved from Boston to Milwaukee in March 1953, they displaced their Triple-A affiliate, the Brewers. With Toledo, Ohio, without baseball (the original Toledo Mud Hens had pulled up stakes for Charleston, West Virginia, on June 23, 1952), the Brewers moved to Toledo and played three seasons there as the Toledo Sox. However, attendance fell by 50 percent—from 344,000 to 156,000—during those three years, and the Braves moved the club to Wichita for the 1956 season. They displaced a Class A Western League franchise and affiliate of the Baltimore Orioles, the Wichita Indians.

While the parent Milwaukee club was setting attendance marks and winning two National League pennants in three years (and missing the 1956 pennant by only a single game), the Toledo-Wichita minor league transfer was a flop. Attendance for the Wichita Braves fell by another 50 percent over Toledo's gate, to 101,000, for 1956, as the team finished with a losing record. It climbed to 145,000 fans for a pennant-winning Wichita team in 1957, led by legendary minor league manager Ben Geraghty. But when the Wichita Braves fell to second place the following year, attendance dropped to 1956 levels. The Braves then moved their Triple-A affiliation to the Louisville Colonels, and the Wichita franchise transferred to become the Fort Worth Cats in Fort Worth, Texas, for 1959 as the American Association reorganized.

Professional baseball returned to Wichita when the Wichita Aeros joined the American Association as an expansion franchise in 1970.

Notable alumni

Ed Charles
Wes Covington
Joey Jay
Lee Maye
Don McMahon
Juan Pizarro
Claude Raymond
Bob Uecker

Sources
Lloyd Johnson and Miles Wolff, editors. The Encyclopedia of Minor League Baseball, 1997 edition. Durham, North Carolina: Baseball America.

References

Defunct American Association (1902–1997) teams
Baseball teams established in 1956
Sports clubs disestablished in 1958
1956 establishments in Kansas
1958 disestablishments in Kansas
Milwaukee Braves minor league affiliates
Atlanta Braves minor league affiliates
Wichita, Kansas
Defunct baseball teams in Kansas
Baseball teams disestablished in 1958
Baseball teams established in 1887